The following lists events that happened during 1995 in New Zealand.

Population
 Estimated population as of 31 December: 3,706,700
 Increase since 31 December 1994: 58,400 (1.60%)
 Males per 100 Females: 97.3

Incumbents

Regal and viceregal
Head of State - Elizabeth II
Governor-General - The Hon Dame Catherine Tizard, GCMG, GCVO, DBE, QSO followed by The Rt Hon. Sir Michael Hardie Boys GNZM, GCMG, QSO

Government
The 44th New Zealand Parliament continued. Government was The National Party, led by Jim Bolger.

Speaker of the House - Peter Tapsell
Prime Minister - Jim Bolger
Deputy Prime Minister - Don McKinnon
Minister of Finance - Bill Birch
Minister of Foreign Affairs - Don McKinnon
Chief Justice — Sir Thomas Eichelbaum

Opposition leaders

See: :Category:Parliament of New Zealand, :New Zealand elections

Greens - Jeanette Fitzsimons and Rod Donald
Act - Roger Douglas
New Zealand First - Winston Peters
Labour - Helen Clark (Leader of the Opposition)

Main centre leaders
Mayor of Auckland - Les Mills
Mayor of Hamilton - Margaret Evans
Mayor of Wellington - Fran Wilde then Mark Blumsky
Mayor of Christchurch - Vicki Buck
Mayor of Dunedin - Richard Walls then Sukhi Turner

Events 
April: The Cambridge Independent closes. The newspaper began as the Waikato Independent in 1904.
 28 April: 13 polytech students and a Department of Conservation Worker die when a viewing platform collapses into a 40-metre deep gorge at Cave Creek in the Paparoa National Park. 
 9 June: Ansett Flight 703 crashes on approach to Palmerston North, killing 4 of 21 on board. Passenger Reginald John Dixon was awarded the New Zealand Cross posthumously.
The Long Bay-Okura and Motu Manawa (Pollen Island) Marine Reserves are established

Arts and literature
Elspeth Sandys wins the Robert Burns Fellowship.

See 1995 in art, 1995 in literature, :Category:1995 books

Music

New Zealand Music Awards
Winners are shown first with nominees underneath.
Album of the Year: Supergroove - Traction
The Mutton Birds - Salty
Dave Dobbyn - Twist
Head Like A Hole - Flik y'self off y'self
Shona Laing - Shona
Single of the Year: Purest Form – Message to My Girl
3 The Hard Way - Hip Hop Holiday
Headless Chickens - George
Sisters Underground - In The Neighbourhood
Supergroove - Cant Get Enough
Best Male Vocalist: Dave Dobbyn – Twist
David Kilgour
Greg Johnson
Jon Toogood
Best Female Vocalist: Fiona McDonald
Emma Paki
Stephanie Tauevihi
Best Group: Supergroove
The Mutton Birds
Headless Chickens
Most Promising Male Vocalist:  Brent Milligan (Pumpkinhead)
Peter Daube (Bilge Festival)
Evan Woodruffe (Melon Twister)
Most Promising Female Vocalist: Sulata Foai
Chloe Reeves
 Helen Goudge (Melon Twister)
Most Promising Group: Sisters Underground
3 The Hard Way
Purest Form
International Achievement: Headless Chickens
Shihad
Crowded House
Best Video: Jo Fisher & Matt Noonan – "Can't Get Enough" (Supergroove)
Johnny Ogilvy - Cruise Control (Headless Chickens)
G Keith/ M Ringrose/ S McGlashen - George (Headless Chickens)
Best Producer: Karl Steven & Malcolm Welsford – Traction (Supergroove)
Neil Finn - Twist
Neil Finn - Greenstone
Best Engineer: Malcolm Welsford - Traction (Supergroove)
Paul Streekstra - Language
Nick Launay - Greenstone
Best Jazz Album: George Chisholm Quintet - Perfect Strangers
John Key - Strange Fruit
Urbanism - Urbanism
Best Classical Album: The NZ Symphony Orchestra - The Three Symphonies / Douglas Lilburn
Auckland Philharmonia Orchestra - NZ Music Volume 5
Dame Malvina Major - Christmastime
The New Zealand National Youth Choir - On Tour in North America '93
Best Country Album: Kevin Greaves – I'm Not Scared of Women
Noel Parlane - Can I Count on You
Merv Pinny - Destiny
Best Folk Album: Windy City Strugglers - Windy City Strugglers
Paul Ubana Jones - A Change of Season
Chris Priestley - Argentina To Invercargill
Best Gospel Album: Derek Lind – Stations
Sir Howard Morrison - Christmas Collection
Jules Riding - The Fisherman
Best Film Soundtrack: Once Were Warriors
Blood Brothers
Jesus Christ Superstar
Best Songwriter: Dave Dobbyn – Language
Don McGlashan - Anchor Me
Neil Finn - Private Universe
Best Cover: Alec Bathgate / Chris Knox - 3 EPs (Tall Dwarfs)
Wayne Conway - Twist (Dave Dobbyn)
Wayne Conway - Broadcast (Strawpeople)
Lifetime Achievement Award: Ian Magan

See: 1995 in music

Performing arts

 Benny Award presented by the Variety Artists Club of New Zealand to Guy Cater.

Radio and television
 12 February: TV One and TV3 goes 24/7.
Horizon Pacific is launched, taking over CTV.
Te Mangai Paho launched.  

See: 1995 in New Zealand television, 1995 in television, List of TVNZ television programming, :Category:Television in New Zealand, TV3 (New Zealand), :Category:New Zealand television shows, Public broadcasting in New Zealand

Film
Bonjour Timothy
Cinema of Unease
Forgotten Silver

See: :Category:1995 film awards, 1995 in film, List of New Zealand feature films, Cinema of New Zealand, :Category:1995 films

Dance
Black Grace, a modern dance company, is formed in Auckland.

Internet
See: NZ Internet History

Sport

Athletics
Chris Mardon wins his first national title in the men's marathon, clocking 2:24:24 in Christchurch, while Robyn Duncan claims her first in the women's championship (2:57:29).

Horse racing

Harness racing
 New Zealand Trotting Cup: Il Vicolo
 Auckland Trotting Cup: Burlington Bertie

Thoroughbred racing

Rugby league

The Auckland Warriors became the first New Zealand-based team to compete in the Australian Rugby League's premiership. They finished 10th, missing out on the final eight due to being docked two points for an incorrect substitution in one of their games.
The North Harbour Sea Eagles defended their Lion Red Cup title, defeating the Auckland Warriors colts 28–21 in the final.
Auckland ended the season holding the Rugby League Cup, after defeating Canterbury.
9 June, New Zealand defeated France 22–6.
16 June, New Zealand drew with France 16-all.
23 June, New Zealand lost to Australia 8-26.
7 July, New Zealand lost to Australia 10–20.
14 July, New Zealand lost to Australia 10–46.
New Zealand competed in the 1995 Rugby League World Cup, losing to Australia 30–20 in extra time in the semi final.

Shooting
Ballinger Belt – Ross Geange (Hamilton/Whatawhata)

Soccer
 The Chatham Cup is won by Waitakere City who beat North Shore United 4–0 in the final.

Births

January–February
 1 January – Kurt Heatherley, Australian rules footballer
 5 January
 Vince Aso, rugby union player
 Toafofoa Sipley, rugby league player
 7 January – Briar Palmer, association footballer
 9 January – Braden Uele, rugby league player
 20 January – Duncan Paia'aua, rugby union player
 23 January
 Scott Ambrose, cyclist
 Tuimoala Lolohea, rugby league player
 24 January – Aimee Fisher, canoeist
 26 January – Sione Katoa rugby league player
 6 February – Geoff Cridge, rugby union player
 7 February – Joel Stevens, association footballer
 25 February – Theresa Fitzpatrick, rugby union player
 27 February – Corey Main, swimmer

March–April
 8 March – Cameron Skelton, rugby union player
 13 March – Whenua Patuwai, singer
 23 March – Tevita Li, rugby union player
 27 March
 Te Atawhai Hudson-Wihongi, association footballer
 Bill Tuiloma, association footballer
 31 March – Te Toiroa Tahuriorangi, rugby union player
 11 April
 Sarah Mason, surfer
 Erin Routliffe, tennis player
 15 April – Anton Lienert-Brown, rugby union player
 19 April – Blake Gibson, rugby union player
 20 April – 
 Sophia Batchelor, swimmer
 Damian McKenzie, rugby union player
 22 April – Catherine Bott, association footballer
 28 April – Jack Hunter, cricketer

May–June
 4 May – Otere Black, rugby union player
 19 May – Taane Milne, rugby league player
 2 June – Mitchell Karpik, rugby union player
 3 June – Thamsyn Newton, cricketer
 8 June – Andre Heimgartner, motor racing driver
 12 June – Atunaisa Moli, rugby union player
 13 June
 Emily Fanning, tennis player
 Jack Goodhue, rugby union player
 Michael Rae, cricketer
 16 June – Akira Ioane, rugby union player
 19 June – Mitchell Hunt, rugby union player
 30 June – Emma Dyke, rower

July–August
 20 July – Moses Leota, rugby league player
 21 July – Zac Williams, cyclist
 2 August – Charnze Nicoll-Klokstad, rugby league player
 5 August – Tim Robertson, orienteering competitor
 7 August – David Nyika, boxer
 16 August – Sam Perry, swimmer
 17 August – Dallin Watene-Zelezniak, rugby league player

September–October
 4 September – Jazz Tevaga, rugby league player
 7 September – Luka Prelevic, association footballer
 11 September – Willis Meehan, rugby league player
 15 September – Joe Ofahengaue, rugby league player
 20 September – Laura Dekker, sailor
 27 September – Zoe McBride, rower
 29 September – Sunline, Thoroughbred racehorse (died 2009)
 2 October
 Sam Brotherton, association footballer
 Te Maire Martin, rugby league player
 6 October – Sam McNicol, rugby union player
 14 October – Chase Tiatia, rugby union player
 19 October – Toni Storm, pro wrestler
 23 October – Sean Wainui, rugby union player (died 2021)
 25 October – So Casual, thoroughbred racehorse

November–December
 11 November – Josh Aloiai, rugby league player
 17 November – Beau-James Wells, freestyle skier
 18 November – Mitchell Dunshea, rugby union player
 23 November – Bradlee Ashby, swimmer
 1 December – Lamar Liolevave, rugby league player
 5 December – Danny Levi, rugby league player
 12 December – Sam Gaze, cross-country cyclist
 18 December – Take A Moment, standardbred racehorse

Deaths

January–March
 16 January – John Charters, rower (born 1913)
 20 January – Thomas Arbuthnott, boxer (born 1911)
 2 February – Kiwi, thoroughbred racehorse (foaled 1977)
 12 February – Dorothy Neal White, librarian (born 1915)
 19 February – Dick Matthews, plant virologist (born 1921)
 22 February – Ron Hardie, local-body politician (born 1924)
 23 February – Thing Big, thoroughbred racehorse (foaled 1970)
 25 February – John O'Brien, rower (born 1927)
 8 March – Sir John Ormond, farmer, politician, businessman (born 1905)
 13 March – Lorelle Corbin, naval officer (born 1916)
 23 March
 Eric McCormick, historian, biographer (born 1906)
 Pat Ralph, marine biology academic (born 1920)
 24 March – Linden Saunders, music teacher and critic, broadcaster (born 1908)
 26 March – Winnie Davin, writer, literary editor (born 1909)

April–June
 22 April – Henry May, politician (born 1912)
 1 May – Wynn Abel, businessman, racehorse owner, athlete (born 1911)
 2 May – James Godwin, military aviator, war crimes investigator (born 1995)
 9 May – John McIndoe, artist (born 1898)
 23 May – Edna Pearce, police officer (born 1906)
 6 June – Sir James Barnes, politician (born 1908)
 9 June – Gordon Rowe, cricketer (born 1915)
 10 June – Bruno Lawrence, musician, actor (born 1941)
 14 June – Dame Rangimarie Hetet, tohunga raranga (born 1892)
 16 June – Ron Smith, public servant, communist, peace activist (born 1921)
 22 June – Spencer Digby, photographer (born 1901)

July–September
 2 July – Richard Toy, architect (born 1911)
 22 July – Jack Bergin, neurologist, anti-abortion campaigner (born 1921)
 25 July
 Eddie Isbey, politician (born 1917)
 Gloria Rawlinson, poet, novelist, short-story writer, editor (born 1918)
 31 July – Joan Cochran, social reformer, sex educator, teacher (born 1912)
 1 August – Colin Gray, World War II fighter ace (born 1914)
 8 August – Dot McNab, military administrator, political organizer (born 1921)
 13 August – Bruce Grant, alpine skier (born 1963)
 14 August – Freda White, show-jumper and racehorse trainer (born 1909)
 25 August – Erich Geiringer, physician, peace activist, writer (born 1917)
 27 August – Sir Geoffrey Roberts, military aviator and leader, airline manager (born 1906)
 1 September – Sylvia Chapman, doctor (born 1896)
 2 September – Ivan Vodanovich, rugby union player, coach and administrator (born 1930)
 3 September – Sir Lance Adams-Schneider, politician, diplomat (born 1919)
 5 September
 John Britten, mechanical engineer, designer (born 1950)
 Brian Poananga, sportsman, military leader, diplomat (born 1924)
 11 September – Peter McIntyre, painter and author (born 1910)
 21 September – Alan Deere, air force pilot (born 1917)
 24 September – Peter Butler, trade unionist, politician (born 1901)

October–December
 15 October – Poul Gnatt, ballet dancer, balletmaster (born 1923)
 16 October
 Cam Campion, politician (born 1943)
 Peter Murdoch, rugby union player (born 1941)
 23 October – Harold Taylor, mathematician, physicist, university administrator, architectural historian (born 1907)
 25 October – Noel Crump, swimmer (born 1916)
 29 October – Fred Gerbic, politician (born 1932)
 31 October – Sir Wallace (Bill) Rowling, 30th Prime Minister of New Zealand (born 1927)
 5 November – Gordon Walters, painter (born 1919)
 13 November – Dale Trendall, classical art historian, university administrator (born 1909)
 20 November – George Burns, rowing coxswain (born 1919)
 1 December – Colin Tapley, actor (born 1907)
 11 December – Euan Robertson, athlete (born 1948)
 21 December – Charlie Tumahai, musician, songwriter (born 1949)
 28 December – Kendrick Smithyman, poet (born 1922)

Full date unknown
 Grant Lingard, artist (born 1961)

References

See also
List of years in New Zealand
Timeline of New Zealand history
History of New Zealand
Military history of New Zealand
Timeline of the New Zealand environment
Timeline of New Zealand's links with Antarctica

 
New Zealand
Years of the 20th century in New Zealand